Classic Odyssey is the 2.5 studio album by SG Wannabe. It is said that a 1 billion won (₩1,000,000,000) budget went into SG Wannabe's new remake album. It included hits such as "My Heart's Treasure Box" (내 마음의 보석상자).

When 2005 was over, SG Wannabe was ranked at #1, with over 400,000 copies sold of their 2nd album, Saldaga, and 12th, with 147,047 copies sold of their remake album on the year-end chart.

Track listing

References

SG Wannabe albums
Stone Music Entertainment albums
2005 albums